Douradina may refer to:

 Douradina, Paraná
 Douradina, Mato Grosso do Sul